Pelka may refer to:

 Pelka, former name of Pelekanos, Kozani, Greece
 Pelka (surname)
 Pełka (archbishop of Gniezno)

See also